The Korte Company, founded in 1958, specializes in design-build, construction management and construction services, and is headquartered in Highland, Illinois, with additional offices in St. Louis, Missouri, Norman, Oklahoma, and Las Vegas, Nevada. The firm’s project expertise includes the design and construction of warehouse/distribution centers, religious facilities, commercial buildings, schools, recreation centers, office complexes, as well as a variety of projects for federal, state and local government agencies. The Korte Company manages, on average, an excess of $330 million in annual construction volume. 

The Korte Company has been considered a pioneer through the late 20th century through new construction methods such as Tilt slab construction and design-build-furnish construction. The company is now run by Ralph Korte's son, Todd Korte. Ralph Korte still remains as a consultant and chairman of the board of directors.

Timeline 

 1958 - The Korte Company, then named "Korte Construction", was created after Ralph Korte was approached to build a milking parlor near Pierron, IL.
 1968 - Official headquarters opened in Highland, Illinois
 1977 - First ConSteel Tilt-Up Building in Highland, Illinois
 1981 - Korte Interiors division created
 1986 - Headquarters moves to St. Louis Union Station in St. Louis, Missouri
 2000 - Name changes from "Korte Construction" to "The Korte Company"

CEOs 
 Ralph Korte - 1958 though 1987
 Vern Eardley - 1987 though 2000
 Todd Korte - 2000 to 2022
 Brent Korte - 2022 to present

Todd Korte 
Todd Korte is the current president and CEO of The Korte Company. Born in 1967, he is the son of The Korte Company's founder, Ralph Korte. He started at The Korte Company in 1981 as a warehouse worker. In 1989 he earned his bachelor's degree in construction science from Kansas State University.

Awards 
 Achievement Award, American Institute of Architects, 1/1/2005 
 St. Louis RCGA Top 50 Businesses Award, St. Louis RCGA, 12/9/2005

Notes

External links
 The Korte Company

Construction and civil engineering companies of the United States
Privately held companies of the United States
Companies based in Illinois